Diplomystes camposensis is a species of velvet catfish endemic to Chile where it occurs in the Valdivia region.  It grows to a length of  TL and is commercially caught as well as being a gamefish.

References
 

camposensis
Catfish of South America
Freshwater fish of Chile
Endemic fauna of Chile
Fish described in 1987
Taxonomy articles created by Polbot